Hold-Up! is a 2012 Spanish-Argentine film directed by Eduard Cortés, filmed in Spain. The script was written by the director with Pedro Costa. The film stars Guillermo Francella, Nicolás Cabré, and Amaia Salamanca.

References

2012 films
Argentine crime comedy films
Spanish crime comedy films
Films set in 1955
2010s Argentine films
2010s Spanish films